Mood is a British musical drama television series created and written by Nicôle Lecky, based on her one-woman play Superhoe. The six-part series premiered on BBC Three on 1 March 2022.

Cast 
 Nicôle Lecky as Sasha Clayton, an aspiring musician
 Ebony Aboagye as young Sasha Clayton
 Lara Peake as Carly Visionz, a social media influencer
 Jessica Hynes as Laura Clayton, Sasha's mother
 Paul Kaye as Kevin, Sasha's stepfather
 Mia Jenkins as Megan Clayton, Sasha's younger sister
 Jordan Duvigneau as Anton
 Flo Wilson as Melrose
 Jorden Myrie as Kobi, Abi's younger brother
 Jason York as Curtis
 Chantelle Alle as Abi, Sasha's childhood friend
 Mohammad Moses Dalmar as Saleem
 Sai Bennett as Esmeralda
 Tom Moutchi as Teeg Jones
 Kiell Smith-Bynoe as Alfred
 Tom Stourton as Josh
 Renee Bailey as Paris
 Jade Thirlwall as Jade
 Anna Vakili as herself (Episode 1)
 Jess Gale as herself (Episode 1)
 Eve Gale as herself (Episode 1)
 Munya Chawawa as himself

Episodes

Production
Lecky first performed her one-woman play Superhoe as a staged reading with the Talawa Theatre Company in 2018 followed by an official debut at the Royal Court Theatre in January 2019, by which point the BBC had already commissioned a pilot from Lecky. At the end of 2019, BBC Three officially greenlit the series, a six-part television adaptation of Lecky's play from Bonafide Films starring, written, and executive produced by Lecky herself. Also attached as executive producers were Lucy Richer, Ayela Butt, and Margery Bone. The pick-up by BBC Three was announced in February 2020.

The rest of the cast, including Lara Peake, Jessica Hynes, Paul Kaye Mia Jenkins, Jordan Duvigneau, Flo Wilson, Jorden Myrie, Jason York, Chantelle Alle, and Mohammad Dalmar, was revealed in October 2021. Notable guest actors included Sai Bennett, Tom Moutchi, Kiell Smith-Bynoe, Tom Stourton, and Renee Bailey.

The show featured cameos from several social media influencers such as Anna Vakili, Eve Gale and Jess Gale. The show also featured Jade Thirlwall from Little Mix.

The creatives behind the series, including directors Dawn Shadforth and Stroma Cairns, first appeared on a panel to discuss the series at the 2021 BBC Showcase. Principal photography began in March 2021.

Release
Mood, initially titled after the play Superhoe, was first announced in October 2021 as part of BBC's then upcoming winter slate. BBC Three released the series' trailer in February 2022. BBC Studios is distributing Mood internationally; it started airing on BBC America in the United States, premiering November 6, 2022.

References

External links
 

2022 British television series debuts
2022 British television series endings
British musical television series
Hip hop television
Television series based on plays
English-language television shows
Television shows set in London
Television series about social media